Albertville is a village in the Canadian province of Saskatchewan within the Rural Municipality of Wise Creek No. 77 and Census Division No. 15. It is approximately 25 km northeast of the City of Prince Albert.

History 
Albertville incorporated as a village on January 1, 1986.

Historical sites
 St. James Roman Catholic Church

Demographics 

See also

 List of communities in Saskatchewan
 List of villages in Saskatchewan

References

Villages in Saskatchewan
Wise Creek No. 77, Saskatchewan
Division No. 15, Saskatchewan